The Jal Satyagraha protest in the Khandwa district of Madhya Pradesh, India, is an ongoing protest by residents of Gogalgaon village, and neighboring hamlets, that involves them remaining immersed in the waters of the Narmada River, as the government has not yet rehabilitated them as promised.

References

Protests in India